Johnny Burke was a Canadian country singer who recorded a series of singles with Acclaim Records in the 1980s.

Born Jean Paul Bourque in the French Acadian community of Rosaireville, New Brunswick, he later moved to Toronto in the early 1960s where he first gained fame as a member of The Blue Valley Boys, and The Maple River Boys working as the house band on CTV's Carl Smith's Country Music Hall television series.

He additionally landed a gig at the famous Horseshoe Tavern in downtown Toronto and for the next four years backed name artists such as Lefty Frizzell, Tex Ritter, Loretta Lynn, Red Foley, Charley Pride, Stringbean, Dottie West, Mel Tillis, Conway Twitty, Waylon Jennings, Glen Campbell, Bobby Bare and Carl Smith.

From 1968 through 1975 Johnny Burke headed up the Caribou Showband, and hosted the popular TV series at the Caribou. That unit eventually became the popular Canadian recording act and touring band, Johnny Burke & Eastwind. The band also became regulars on the radio series The Opry North Show.

Burke enjoyed great success as both solo recording artist and with the band Johnny Burke & Eastwind, with releases on the Columbia, Caribou, Grand Slam, Broadland, and Acclaim record labels.

His early career solo releases included three Top 10 hits for Columbia in 1967 including the hit, "I Can't Even Do Wrong Right".

The 1977 Johnny Burke & Eastwind single "Wild Honey" was one of the most played records on Canadian country radio in the late 70s-early 80s.

Johnny Burke continued to perform regularly, often teaming up with Hall of Famer Myrna Lorrie, and longtime music partner Harold MacIntyre in a Canadian Country Legends package show.

His vocal style gave the traditional country sound a unique flavour. Few could match his talent for song presentation. He had 'twang' and feel and a sincerity that shone through every lyric. The pleasure he derived while performing spilled over to his audience and back to the stage. It was always evident that Johnny Burke truly loved to entertain.

As a member of the Canadian Country Music Hall of Fame, Burke, was diagnosed with esophageal cancer in August 2016 but was continuing on with his music career. He was 77-year-old. 

"The tumour was inoperable", said Burke, and so the musician was fighting the disease through other methods, such as diet.
 
"So far I can still sing," he said.

He is survived by his wife Teresa.

References

20th-century births
2017 deaths
Canadian country singer-songwriters
Acadian people
Year of birth missing
Place of death missing